The Columbia Basin pygmy rabbit is an isolated population of pygmy rabbit (Brachylagus idahoensis), that is native only to a single Columbia Basin area of Washington state. The Columbia Basin pygmy rabbit is the smallest North American rabbit. While the IUCN considers the species as a whole to be of least concern, the US Fish & Wildlife Service considers this a distinct population segment, and thus merits protections under the Endangered Species Act. The last purebred Columbia Basin pygmy rabbit died in 2008, marking the end of the pure genetic line.

Characteristics
Pygmy rabbits are the only North American rabbits that dig burrows and live in a sagebrush habitat. In the wild, pygmy rabbits eat sagebrush almost exclusively in the winter; during summer, they eat a more varied diet. They may have two to four litters of about two to six kits during the spring and summer breeding seasons. Population decline is widely attributed to predation and habitat loss caused by agricultural development and wildfires.

Conservation
Unlike most rabbits, the Columbia Basin pygmy rabbit did not breed prodigiously in the wild nor in captivity, partially due to inbreeding within the tiny wild population. As a result, they were cross bred with pygmy rabbits from Idaho, and subsequent breeding efforts have been more successful. In 2009, the Oregon Zoo produced 26 kits, bringing the total offspring population for the year to 73 kits among participating breeding facilities. In 2010, the zoo found that pairings based on familiarity and preferences resulted in greater breeding success than pairings based only on genetic relatedness.

Results from 2011 through 2014 efforts were encouraging for recovery of the species to the state. WDFW developed techniques for breeding wild and captive-bred pygmy rabbits in protected semi-wild enclosures on wildlife areas to increase numbers of individuals for release. From 2011 to 2013, biologists translocated 109 pygmy rabbits from Nevada, Utah, Oregon and Wyoming to the breeding enclosures in Douglas and Grant Counties, along with the remaining captive rabbits. Today over 1,300 kits have been produced in the enclosures since 2011. This high production allowed for the release of over 1,200 rabbits to the wild on Sagebrush Flat Wildlife Area from 2011 through 2014. Due to this success, beginning in 2015, pygmy rabbits are being released into a second recovery area located on the private land of The Nature Conservancy Preserve in Grant County. Released pygmy rabbits are closely monitored to collect data on breeding, habitat use, survival, mortalities and other factors to modify reintroduction techniques and adaptively manage the newly-formed population.

See also
 Pygmy rabbits — (Brachylagus idahoensis)
 United States Fish and Wildlife Service list of endangered species

References 

Leporidae
Rabbit, Pygmy Columbia Basin
Rabbit, Pygmy Columbia Basin
Rabbit, Pygmy Columbia Basin
Rabbit, Pygmy Columbia Basin
Endemic fauna of Washington (state)

hu:Észak-amerikai törpenyúl